De Kooy is a hamlet in the Dutch province of North Holland.

The hamlet is known for the nearby naval air field, De Kooy Airfield, which was constructed in 1918. It has no place name signs.

References

Populated places in North Holland
Den Helder